Giovanni Battista Fiorini was an Italian painter of the late Renaissance period.

He was a native of Bologna. He was active at the close of the 16th century, and died after 1595. He is chiefly known as a coadjutor of Cesare Aretusi, with whom he painted several pictures at Bologna and Brescia, and distinguished himself especially as a good designer. Among his works:

Christ Giving the Keys to St. Peter, Bologna Cathedral.
Birth of the Virgin, San Giovanni in Monte, Bologna.
Descent from the Cross, San Benedetto, Bologna.
Mass of St Gregory, Padri Servi, Bologna.
Birth of the Virgin, Sant'Afra, Brescia.
Fresco by Fiorini alone, Sala Regia, Vatican.

References
 

Year of birth missing
Year of death missing
16th-century Italian painters
Italian male painters
Painters from Bologna